Berke Hatipoğlu (born 7 May 1976) is an architect, musician, and lead guitarist for the Turkish rock band, Redd.

Biography
Berke Hatipoğlu was born on 7 May 1976 in Istanbul, Turkey. At the age of 14 he began to play guitar, initially being educated by his father, Haluk Hatipoğlu. After playing guitar during high school years, in 1994 he started a professional music career in Istanbul. In a music contest held during the opening ceremony of the Tuyap music fair in 1995, with Michael D'Angelo as jury member, he won the first place as the best guitarist. In 1996, Güneş Duru and Ilke Hatipoğlu joined the Ten band founded by Berke Hatipoğlu and Doğan Duru. Thus the core members of their band was formed, which was later renamed to Redd. He performed in many concerts and festivals with Ten band from 1996 until 2002.

In 1998, along with his younger brother, like Hatipoğlu, he participated in an alternative project, Gökalp Baykal & Catwalk, to release an album named Günaydın Hüzün, where he played and arranged all songs and wrote one. He spent the period between 2000 and 2004 writing and arranging songs along with Redd members and finally they released Redd's first studio album, 50-50 in 2005.

Berke Hatipoğlu has performed as guitarist, back vocal, songwriter and arranger in all Redd albums; "50-50" (2005), Kirli Suyunda Parıltılar (2006), Plastik Çiçekler ve Böcek (2008), Gecenin Fişi Yok (2008), 21 (2009), a soundtrack album, Prensesin Uykusu (2010) and Hayat Kaçık Bir Uykudur (2012). Also, he designed the album cover for "Günaydın Hüzün" and some Redd albums like "Plastik Çiçek ve Böcek" and the DVD of Redd's acoustic concert, "Gecenin Fişi Yok" (2008).

Berke Hatipoğlu studied environmental engineering at Istanbul Technical University from 1994 to 1997 but gave up this field and started to study architecture at Istanbul 
Technical University and graduated in 2001. Also being an expert in 3D and digital architectural illustration, he held a teaching position in the faculty of architecture at Maltepe University in 2003 through 2009 and has taught in the faculty of fine arts at Doğuş University since 2008. He has participated in several architectural projects, conferences and contests.

Instruments

Guitars
Fender Custom Shop Telecaster '63 Relic
Fender Telecaster Standard
Gibson Les Paul Standard
Gibson ES 333
Martin Acoustic D1
Yamaha 12 String
Edward&Jones Mandolin
Eko Classic Guitar
Framus Bass

Amplifiers
Marshall Bluesbreaker Reissue
Marshall JCM800
Marshall JTM30

Pedals
Fulltone Fulldrive 2
Fulltone Fat boost 2
İbanez Tube Screamer TS9
Electro Harmonix Pulsar
Electro Harmonix MemoryMan
Electro Harmonix Freeze
Electro Harmonix Electric Mistress
Electro Harmonix Holygrail
Boss DD3
Boss TU2
Keeley Compressor
Carl Martin Octa Switch
ProcoRat Vintage
ProcoRat Deuce
Jim Dunlop CryBaby Wah

Discography with Redd
50-50 (2005)
Kirli Suyunda Parıltılar (2006)
Plastik Çiçekler ve Böcek (2008)
Gecenin Fişi Yok (2008)
21 (2009)
Prensesin Uykusu (2010) (soundtrack album)
Hayat Kaçık Bir Uykudur (2012)

References

1976 births
Living people